Emma Weiß (born 22 January 2000) is a German freestyle skier who competes internationally.

She competed in the FIS Freestyle Ski and Snowboarding World Championships 2021, where she placed eleventh in women's aerials.

References

2000 births
Living people
German female freestyle skiers
Freestyle skiers at the 2022 Winter Olympics
Olympic freestyle skiers of Germany
People from Albstadt
Sportspeople from Tübingen (region)
21st-century German women